Ross Branch may refer to:

 Ross Branch (motorcyclist),  motorcycle racer
 Ross Branch (railway line), a New Zealand branch line